USS Gurnard has been the name of more than one United States Navy ship, and may refer to:

 , a Gato-class submarine in commission from 1942 to 1945
 , a Sturgeon-class nuclear submarine in commission from 1968 to 1995

United States Navy ship names